The 2008 Sprint Gas V8 Supercars Manufacturers Challenge was the third meeting of the 2008 V8 Supercar season. It was held on the weekend of 13 to 16 March at Albert Park Street Circuit, in the inner suburbs of Melbourne, the capital of Victoria. The meeting was a non-championship affair, conducted under a unique Holden vs Ford format. It was the lead support category for the 2008 Australian Grand Prix.

Qualifying
Qualifying was held on Thursday 13 March. Mark Skaife was fastest as the Holden Racing Team continued its resurgence. Steven Richards shook off his car destroying crash at Eastern Creek to be second fastest ahead of Jason Richards in the Tasman Motorsport Commodore. The end of qualifying was nervous with the first top ten shootout of the season to be held the following day and while Russell Ingall scraped into the top ten, the unique Ford vs Holden rules for this event which demanded five of each manufacturer in the top ten saw Ingall, as the sixth Holden, relegated in favour of the fifth Ford, Steven Johnson. Michael Patrizi qualified 28th on the debut of both himself and his Ford Rising Stars Racing in the main game series.

Top Ten shootout
The top ten shootout, the first to be held in 2008, was held on Friday 14 March. Garth Tander kept the Holden Racing Team atop the timesheets, picking off pole position, holding off a motivated Craig Lowndes for the position. Steven Richards was third fastest, but would be relegated to fourth on the grid as the Ford vs Holden format stated that the grid would be formed in alternating manufacturer order ahead of outright pace, meaning fifth fastest qualifying Rick Kelly would start third as the second fastest Holden.

Race 1
Race 1 was held on Friday 12 March immediately after the shootout.

Race 2
Race 2 was held on Saturday 13 March.

Race 3
Race 3 was held on Sunday 14 March.

Results
Results as follows:

Qualifying

Race 1 results

Race 2 results

Race 3 results

See also
2008 Australian Grand Prix

References

External links
Official site for Australian Grand Prix
Official site for V8 Supercar
Official timing and results

V8 Supercars Manufacturers Challenge